Silvio Tanzi (1879 – 29 November 1909) was an Italian composer and music critic. He was born in Sassello and died in Milan.

He was the brother of writer Drusilla Tanzi who was married to Nobel laluriet Eugenio Montale.

In the poetry by Eugenio Montale 
Eugenio Montale remembered his wife's brother in the poem Your brother died young, thirteenth text of the first book of Xenia :

References

19th-century Italian composers
20th-century Italian composers
Italian music critics
1879 births
1909 suicides
People from the Province of Savona
Suicides by firearm in Italy
Burials at the Cimitero Monumentale di Milano
1909 deaths